Younès Essalhi (born 20 February 1993) is a male Moroccan long-distance runner. He competed in the 5000 metres event at the 2015 World Championships in Athletics in Beijing, China.

See also
 Morocco at the 2015 World Championships in Athletics

References

External links

Moroccan male long-distance runners
Living people
Place of birth missing (living people)
1993 births
World Athletics Championships athletes for Morocco
Athletes (track and field) at the 2016 Summer Olympics
Olympic athletes of Morocco
Mediterranean Games gold medalists for Morocco
Mediterranean Games medalists in athletics
Athletes (track and field) at the 2018 Mediterranean Games
Mediterranean Games gold medalists in athletics
20th-century Moroccan people
21st-century Moroccan people